Content or contents may refer to:

Media
 Content (media), information or experience provided to audience or end-users by publishers or media producers
 Content industry, an umbrella term that encompasses companies owning and providing mass media and media metadata
 Content provider, a provider of non-core services in the telecommunications industry
 Free content, published material that can be used, copied, and modified without significant legal restriction
 Open content, published material licensed to authorize copying and modification by anyone
 Web content, information published on the World Wide Web
 Content format, an encoded format for converting a specific type of data to displayable information
 Digital content
 Table of contents, a list of chapters or sections in a document

Places
 Content (Centreville, Maryland) also known as C.C. Harper Farm, a historic home located at Centreville, Maryland
 Content (Upper Marlboro, Maryland) also known as the Bowling House, a historic home located in Upper Marlboro, Maryland
 Content, Pennsylvania, an unincorporated community

People with the surname
 Charles Content (born 1987), Mauritian footballer
 Karina Content (born 1960), Dutch writer and politician
 Sylvain Content (born 1971), Mauritian footballer

Arts and entertainment

Music
 Content (Gang of Four album), a 2011 studio album by Gang of Four
 Content (Joywave album), a 2017 studio album by Joywave
 "Content", a 2021 song by Bo Burnham from the special Bo Burnham: Inside

Periodicals
 Brill's Content, a former media watchdog publication by Steven Brill (journalist)

Television and web series
 Content (web series); an Australian ABC comedy web series starring Charlotte Nicdao and Gemma Bird Matheson

Science and mathematics
 Content (measure theory), a concept in mathematics
 Content analysis, a methodology used in the social sciences and humanities for studying the content of communication
 Primitive part and content, in mathematics, content is the greatest common divisor of the coefficients of a polynomial

Ships
 HMS Content, ships of the British Royal Navy
 USS Content (SP-538), a United States Navy vessel

Other uses
 Content (Freudian dream analysis), a dream as it is remembered and the hidden meaning of the dream in Freudian analysis
 Contents insurance, insurance that pays for damage to, or loss of, an individual's personal possessions whilst they are located within that individual's home

See also
 Content security (disambiguation)
 Contentment, a state of being